Lund Chapel is a parish church of the Church of Norway in Namsos municipality in Trøndelag county, Norway. It is located in the village of Lund. It is an annex church for the Fosnes parish which is part of the Namdal prosti (deanery) in the Diocese of Nidaros. The white, wooden church was built in a long church style in 1965. The church seats about 105 people.

History
The materials (first used in the old Kolvereid Church in 1658 and then reused as Opøyfjorden Chapel in 1874) were then reused again to build the new Lund Chapel to serve the extreme southern part of Nærøy municipality. In 2020, the municipal borders were changed and this chapel became part of Namsos Municipality and the Fosnes parish.

See also
List of churches in Nidaros

References

External links
Picture of Opløyfjorden Chapel (used to build Lund Chapel)

Namsos
Churches in Trøndelag
Long churches in Norway
Wooden churches in Norway
20th-century Church of Norway church buildings
Churches completed in 1965
1965 establishments in Norway